LaCONES or Laboratory for the Conservation of Endangered Species, is a Council of Scientific and Industrial Research lab located in Hyderabad. It was conceptualised by Lalji Singh. It is India's only research facility engaged in conservation and preservation of wildlife and its resources. It was established in 1998 with the help of Central Zoo Authority of India, CSIR and the government of Andhra Pradesh. It was dedicated to the nation in 2007 by then President of India APJ Abdul Kalam. It is a part of the Centre for cellular and molecular biology. India's first genetic bank for wildlife conservation, the National wildlife genetic resource bank (NWGRB) established by the government at LaCONES in 2018.

See also
Billy Arjan Singh
Vava Suresh

References

Council of Scientific and Industrial Research
1998 establishments in Andhra Pradesh
Wildlife conservation in India
Environmental conservation
Research institutes in Hyderabad, India